Grylloblatta rothi is a species of insect in the family Grylloblattidae found in Oregon. Its type locality is Happy Valley in Deschutes County, Oregon, United States. It is also known from Mount Hood and Crater Lake.

References

Grylloblattidae
Insects of the United States
Insects described in 1953